Class 185 may refer to:

TRAXX, Deutsche Bahn Class 185 diesel locomotive
British Rail Class 185, A diesel multiple unit built by Siemens for the UK market